Suxian may refer to:

Suxian District, in Chenzhou, Hunan, China
Suxian Hill, in Hunan, China
Su County, or Suxian, former name of Suzhou, city in Anhui, China